The 1955–56 Hapoel Kfar Saba season was the club's 29th season since its establishment in 1928, and 8th since the establishment of the State of Israel.

At the start of the season, the league which started during the previous season was completed, with the club finishing 12th (out of 14), which meant the club had to compete in a promotion/relegation play-offs against the 11th placed club, Beitar Jerusalem, and the two Liga Bet winners, Maccabi Jaffa and Hapoel Kiryat Haim. Haopel Kfar Saba placed 2nd in the play-offs, preserving their top division status.

The new league season, with the top division being renamed Liga Leumit, began on 3 December 1955 and was completed on 3 June 1956, with the club finishing in 12th and bottom position, relegating to Liga Alef.

Match Results

Legend

1954–55 Liga Alef
The league began on 6 February 1955, and by the time the previous season ended, only 20 rounds of matches were completed, with the final 6 rounds being played during September and October 1955.

Final table

Matches

Results by match

Promotion/relegation play-offs

Table

Beitar Jerusalem relegated to Liga Alef

Matches

1955–56 Liga Leumit

Final table

Matches

Results by match

References

Hapoel Kfar Saba F.C. seasons
Hapoel Kfar Saba